The 2014 Challenger Ficrea, presentado por ultra was a professional tennis tournament played on hard courts. It was the twelfth edition of the tournament which was part of the 2014 ATP Challenger Tour. It took place in León, Mexico between 31 March and 6 April 2013.

Singles main-draw entrants

Seeds

Other entrants
The following players received wildcards into the singles main draw:
  Mauricio Astorga
  Luis Patiño
  Lucas Gómez
  Alex Bogomolov Jr.

The following players received entry from the qualifying draw:
  Daniel Garza
  Kevin King
  Marcus Daniell
  Purav Raja

Doubles main-draw entrants

Seeds

Other entrants
The following pairs received wildcards into the doubles main draw:

 Lucas Gómez /  Agustín Velotti
 Antonio Ruiz-Rosales /  Manuel Sánchez
 Daniel Garza /  Alejandro Moreno Figueroa

Champions

Singles

 Rajeev Ram def.  Samuel Groth, 6–2, 6–2

Doubles

 Samuel Groth /  Chris Guccione def.  Marcus Daniell /  Artem Sitak, 6–4, 6–3

External links
Official Website

Challenger Ficrea
Torneo Internacional Challenger León
Challenger Ficrea
Challenger Ficrea
2014 in Mexican tennis